The Petasis reagent, named after Nicos A. Petasis, is an organotitanium compound with the formula Cp2Ti(CH3)2. It is an orange-colored solid.

Preparation and use
The Petasis reagent is prepared by the salt metathesis reaction of methylmagnesium chloride or methyllithium with titanocene dichloride:

 Cp2TiCl2  +  2 CH3MgCl   →  Cp2Ti(CH3)2  +  2 MgCl2

This compound is used for the transformation of carbonyl groups to terminal alkenes.  It exhibits similar reactivity to the Tebbe reagent and Wittig reaction. Unlike the Wittig reaction, the Petasis reagent can react with a wide range of aldehydes, ketones and esters. The Petasis reagent is also very air stable, and is commonly used in solution with toluene or THF.

The Tebbe reagent and the Petasis reagent share a similar reaction mechanism.  The active olefinating reagent, Cp2TiCH2, is generated in situ upon heating.  With the organic carbonyl, this titanium carbene forms a four membered oxatitanacyclobutane that releases the terminal alkene.

In contrast to the Tebbe reagent, homologs of the Petasis reagent are relatively easy to prepare by using the corresponding alkyllithium instead of methyllithium, allowing the conversion of carbonyl groups to alkylidenes.

See also
 Nysted reagent
Titanium–zinc methylenation

References

Organotitanium compounds
Coordination complexes
Reagents for organic chemistry
Titanocenes
Cyclopentadienyl complexes
Titanium(IV) compounds